Smith's Ferry was a ferry near Reedley, California.  The ferry was usable year-round and was preferred by customers over Pool's Ferry because it had better services and a superior ferry boat.  An 11-room hotel was also located at the site. It was located at the southwest edge of Reedley. It was founded by James Smith in 1855 and disestablished in 1874.

References

1874 disestablishments in the United States
1855 establishments in California
Ferries of California